Buenos Aires is a district of the Palmares canton, in the Alajuela province of Costa Rica.

Geography 
Buenos Aires has an area of  km² and an elevation of  metres.

Demographics 

For the 2011 census, Buenos Aires had a population of  inhabitants.

Transportation

Road transportation 
The district is covered by the following road routes:
 National Route 1
 National Route 135
 National Route 148
 National Route 169

References 

Districts of Alajuela Province
Populated places in Alajuela Province